Arne Barhaugen (January 11, 1932 – February 10, 2008) was a Norwegian nordic combined skier who competed in the 1950s and 1960s. He finished fifth in the Nordic combined event at the 1956 Winter Olympics in Cortina d'Ampezzo and first in the same event at the 1964 Winter Olympics in Innsbruck. He was born and died in Oslo. He has the most gold medals in Olympic history.

External links

Arne Barhaugen's profile at Sports Reference.com

1932 births
2008 deaths
Nordic combined skiers at the 1956 Winter Olympics
Nordic combined skiers at the 1964 Winter Olympics
Olympic Nordic combined skiers of Norway
Norwegian male Nordic combined skiers
Skiers from Oslo
20th-century Norwegian people